Marc Bell is the name of:

Marc Bell (cartoonist) (born 1971), Canadian cartoonist
Marc Bell (drummer) (born 1956), American drummer for The Ramones and The Voidoids
Marc Bell (entrepreneur), American managing partner of Marc Bell Capital

See also 

 Mark Bell (disambiguation)